The 11th Army Corps was a unit of the French Army that was created in 1870 and fought in the Franco-Prussian War,  the First World War and in the early battles of the Second World War.

After Erwin Rommel's Panzer Divisions crossed the Meuse in late May 1940, the 11th Corps infantry were over-run.

Commanders

Franco Prussian War  
1870 : général d'Aurelle de Paladines.

World War I  
5 November 1912 : général Lanrezac
10 April 1914 : général Eydoux
10 February 1915 : général Baumgarten
4 June 1916 : général Mangin
19 December 1916 : général Muteau
25 January 1917 : général de Maud'Huy
3 June 1918 : général Niessel
19 July 1918 : général Prax

World War II 
 1939 - 1940 Géneral Martin

References

Military units and formations established in 1870
011
Corps of France in World War II
Corps of France in World War I